Jeroen Lambers (born 20 October 1980) is a Dutch former professional footballer who played as a goalkeeper

Career
Lambers began playing football with Groningen after being scouted as a 17-year-old at his local club VV Zwartermeer. After seven years as a reserve goalkeeper in Groningen, Lambers had a successful trial with Falkirk and signed for the Scottish Premier League club in 2006.

Lambers returned to the Netherlands in 2007 after losing his starting spot in Falkirk to Kasper Schmeichel. Instead, he signed with Veendam where he was mostly a backup to Barry Ditewig. After playing some years in the lower leagues for WKE and VV Zwartemeer, he retired from football 2016 due to a bacterial infection in his knee.

References

1980 births
Living people
Dutch footballers
Eredivisie players
Eerste Divisie players
FC Groningen players
Dutch expatriate footballers
Expatriate footballers in Scotland
Scottish Premier League players
Falkirk F.C. players
SC Veendam players
WKE players
Association football goalkeepers
Footballers from Emmen, Netherlands
Dutch expatriate sportspeople in Scotland